Dillzan Neville Wadia Also Known as Dillzan Wadia is a Bollywood actor who was seen in Hindi movies like Phir Aik Sazish and Bollywood Villa 3D. His movies are Four Pillars of Basement and  Honeymoon.

Film career
Dillzan Wadia born in 1989. began his Bollywood career in 2007  Wadia debuted as an actor in 2012 with a role in Phir Aik Sazish. This movie is a story about Rohan played by Dillzan who helps his girlfriend in finding out the killers of her mother. However, due to budget constraints, Dillzan was signed. Phir Ek Sazish was presented by Dillzan Wadia Productions in association with Modi Films. After Phir Ek Sazish, Dilzan was seen in a movie named Bollywood Villa 3D, which had released in July 2014. He was seen playing the role of a Bollywood hero in the film.

His latest release was Four Pillars Of Basement, also starring Bruna Abdullah, Alaya Singh and Shawar Ali, which has an equal mix of drama, romance and suspense
Dillzan wadi also played CCL Celebrity cricket league for Sohel khans ' Sunel Shettys Mumbai heroes
also is a part of ekta kapoor reality show BCL.

Filmography

Awards
 Nominated for the International Film & Entertainment Festival Australia (IFEFA) Awards
 IFEFA Best Actor Critic Award
 Style Award by Tassel Fashion & Lifestyle Award

References

External links

Dillzan Wadia movies at Box Office India

1982 births
Living people
Indian male film actors
21st-century Indian male actors